Óscar Hugo López Rivas is a Guatemalan politician. He serves as Guatemala's Minister of Education.

References

Living people
Government ministers of Guatemala
Year of birth missing (living people)